Bufalino may refer to:

 Bufalino (surname), an Italian and American surname
 Bufalino crime family, an Italian-American Mafia crime family

See also 

 Bufalini (disambiguation)
 Bufalo (disambiguation)